Syed Farooq Ahmad Andrabi (born ) is an Indian politician and the former member of Jammu and Kashmir Legislative Assembly. He represented Dooru assembly constituency of Anantnag district in 2014. He was appointed to the state ministry in 2016 and subsequently served minister for Hajj and Auqaf until he resigned from the ministry in December 2017 in an attempt to appointed his nephew Tassaduq Hussain Mufti to the post.

He also served minister for Kashmir Irrigation & Flood Control Department, Public Health Engineering Department, and Irrigation & Flood Control Department. Prior to his resignation, he served minister for Power Development Department and Department of Industry & Commerce.

Biography 
He was born to Syed Shah Andrabi around 1959 in Doru Shahabad, Jammu and Kashmir. He graduated from an uncertain collage. Later in 1980, he obtained Bachelor's of Arts degree in Commerce from the University of Kashmir.

References 

1959 births
Living people
Jammu and Kashmir Peoples Democratic Party politicians
People from Anantnag district
University of Kashmir alumni
Jammu and Kashmir MLAs 2014–2018